Susan Karike Huhume (–11 April 2017) was a Papua New Guinean housewife, who, as a schoolgirl, designed the colours of her country's national flag.

She married Nanny Huhume and they had four children and twelve grandchildren. She died in April 2017 after suffering a stroke and was buried on 28 July 2017.

Background
In 1971, when Karike was aged 15, her school, the Catholic Mission School at Yule Island in Central Province was visited by the Selection Committee on Constitutional Development on 12 February. The committee already had a preliminary design for a new flag for Papua New Guinea, which had been designed by an Australian artist, Hal Holman. Nevertheless, they asked students to create a new colour palette for the flag. Karike did not believe the original colours of blue, yellow and green were traditional enough, nor did she like the vertical stripes that the flag was split into. She used a diagonal line and the colours red, black and yellow, as well as keeping the motifs of the Southern Cross and the bird of paradise. The new design for the flag was drawn in a page torn from her exercise book. It was presented to the committee on 1 March 1971 and was formally adopted as the flag of Papua New Guinea on 4 March 1971.

Awards and recognition
In 2017, the Papua New Guinea National Museum & Art Gallery was redeveloped and a new gallery was named after Karike. 

Despite designing the colours of the national flag, Karike's achievement went largely unrecognised during her lifetime. She received no pension from the government and lived in poverty. The three-month delay between her death and her burial was due to the fact that the Prime Minister's office had promised her family that she would have a state funeral, yet rescinded on this promise.

Gallery

References

1950s births
2017 deaths
Papua New Guinean women
Flag designers
People from Gulf Province
20th-century women
21st-century women